Starrcast is a professional wrestling fan convention promoted by Conrad Thompson. The event typically runs for  four days— from Thursday to Sunday – and features wrestlers, wrestling personalities and podcast hosts, interviews, fan activities, and meet-and-greets.

History

Thompson originally had the idea of a fan convention during the NWA Legends Fanfest in 2017, but it was cancelled.  Later in December, Thompson pitched the idea to Cody Rhodes (one of the founders of AEW) and was intrigued by the idea of a wrestling podcast convention. After some talks, Thompson emailed him the itinerary and Cody told Matt Jackson and Nick Jackson (two-thirds of the founders of All In) and he told Thompson they liked it. The event would be compared to WrestleCon that is held during WrestleMania weekend.

In March 2018, following the announcement of All In, to coincide with the event, Thompson announced he would hold the Starrcast, a fan convention which would feature numerous wrestlers, wrestling personalities and podcast personalities.

On August 29, the full schedule for Starrcast was released. The event, held August 30 to September 2, was produced by Global Force Entertainment (GFW) on FITE TV.

In January 2019 it was announced that Starrcast would return in conjunction with All Elite Wrestling's Double or Nothing event in Las Vegas, Nevada.

The 2022 Starrcast was held in conjunction with WWE's SummerSlam in Nashville, Tennessee, with the event built around Ric Flair's Last Match.

Dates and venues

Notable guests 

A. C. H.
Adam Page
Allie
Allysin Kay
Amber O'Neal
Angelina Love
Arn Anderson
Austin Aries
Baby Doll
The Barbarian
Bea Priestley
Bill Apter
Black Taurus
The Blue Meanie
Brandi Rhodes
Bruce Prichard
Brutus Beefcake
Bryan Alvarez
Bull James
Bully Ray
Bret Hart
Carl Ouellet
Cheeseburger
Chelsea Green
Christian
Christopher Daniels
Chuckie T.
CM Punk
Cody Rhodes
Colt Cabana
Dalton Castle
Dave Meltzer
David Arquette
David McLane
David Schultz
Deonna Purrazzo
Diamond Dallas Page
Disco Inferno
DJZ
Don West
Dustin Rhodes
Dutch Mantell
Earl Hebner
Eddie Kingston
Eric Bischoff
Ethan Page
Fénix
Frankie Kazarian
Gail Kim
Glacier
Haku
Hurricane Helms
Ian Riccaboni
Insane Clown Posse
Ivelisse Velez
J. J. Dillon
James Ellsworth
James Storm
Jay Briscoe
Jeff Cobb
Jeff Jarrett
Jerry Lawler
Jimmy Hart
Jim Ross 
Jerry Lynn
Jessicka Havok
Jim Johnston
Jimmy Havoc
Joel Gertner
Joey Janela
Joey Ryan
Jon Moxley
Jonathan Coachman 
Kenny Omega
Kenta Kobashi
Kevin Kelly
Kevin Nash
Kevin Sullivan
Kia Stevens
Kip Sabian
Konnan
Kota Ibushi
Leva Bates
Lex Luger
Lisa Marie Varon
Lita 
Macaulay Culkin
Madusa
Magnum T. A.
Marc Mero
Maxwell Jacob Friedman
Marcus Bagwell
Mark Briscoe
Marty Scurll
Matt Cross
Matt Striker
Mia Yim
Mikey Whipwreck
Missy Hyatt
Nick Aldis
Pentagón Jr.
Peter Avalon
Punishment Martinez
Rebel
Rey Mysterio
Ricky Steamboat
Road Warrior Animal
Robbie E
Ron Funches
Ron Simmons
Rosa Mendes 
Rosemary
Sami Callihan
Sammy Guevara
Samuel Shaw
Sandman
Scarlett Bordeaux
Scorpio Sky
Scott Hall
Raven
Scott Steiner
Sean Mooney
Sgt. Slaughter
Shane Douglas
Shannon Moore
Shawn Daivari
Shawn Spears
SoCal Val
Stephen Amell
Summer Rae
Sting
Shane Helms 
Tama Tonga
Tanga Loa
Tazz
Taylor Williamson
Teddy Long
Tenille Dashwood
Tessa Blanchard
Tommy Dreamer
Tommy Young
Tony Schiavone
Trent Barreta
Tully Blanchard
Veda Scott
Velvet Sky
Wade Keller
X-Pac
The Young Bucks

See also 
List of professional wrestling conventions

References

External links 
Official Twitter – Starrcast

All Elite Wrestling
Global Force Wrestling
Professional wrestling conventions
Recurring events established in 2018